Pepelyshi is a rural locality (a village) in Suksunsky District, Perm Krai, Russia. The population was 180 as of 2010. There are 4 streets.

Geography 
Pepelyshi is located 12 km northeast of Suksun (the district's administrative centre) by road. Sasykovo is the nearest rural locality.

References 

Rural localities in Perm Krai